The 1993 Edmonton Eskimos finished in 2nd place in the West Division with a 12–6 record and won the 81st Grey Cup.

Offseason

CFL Draft

Schedule

Regular season

Season Standings

Season schedule

Total attendance: 274,836 
Average attendance: 30,537 (50.8%)

Playoffs

Grey Cup

References

Edmonton Elks seasons
Grey Cup championship seasons
N. J. Taylor Trophy championship seasons